Devil Dice (known in Japan as XI) is a puzzle video game developed by Shift exclusively on PlayStation. It was released by Sony Computer Entertainment in Japan in 1998 and Europe in 1999, and by THQ in North America in 1998. The game is a million-seller and a demo version was released as a PlayStation Classic game for the PlayStation 3 and PlayStation Portable (PSP) on 7 November 2007.

Gameplay

Devil Dice is a unique puzzle video game, where the player controls a small devil that runs around a grid covered in large dice.  The player can both stand atop dice, and stand on the ground (with the dice towering above).  When standing on the dice, the player can move from die to die, or can roll a die in the direction he or she runs, revealing a different face as the die rotates.  Creating a group of adjacent dice with identical pips—the size of which must be at least the number of pips—causes those dice to slowly sink into the field before disappearing. Chain reactions are possible by adding additional dice to a sinking set. Different types of dice are available in some modes, with different properties to make the game more challenging.

The game features the following modes:

 Battle - Pits the player against a single computer opponent, both attempting to build up chains and negate those of the opponent. 
 Puzzle - Mode in which players must solve puzzles (i.e., clear all dice) using only a limited number of steps or moves. Solving a whole row of puzzles allows players access to a picture that they can play on in Battle mode.
 Trial - The standard arcade-style mode, where the objective is to remove as many dice as possible (and thus score as many points as possible) before the grid completely fills with dice.
 Wars - quickfire multiplayer mode, supporting up to four simultaneous computer opponents, or five human players when using a multitap.  Players damage each other as they complete chains, with the last man standing becoming the winner.

Reception 

Devil Dice received favorable reviews according to the review aggregation website GameRankings. GamePro said: "If you thought Intelligent Qube was a walk in the park, Devil Dice will have you screaming in frustration. This one's truly devilish." Next Generation said: "THQ's puzzler may be too hard for some [...] but its learning curve is just right for any player who's been around the puzzle gaming block once or twice. Devil Dice comes highly recommended." In Japan, Famitsu gave it a score of 30 out of 40.

Famitsu reported that the title sold over 131,815 units in its first week on the market and approximately 864,844 units during its lifetime in Japan. GamesTM regarded it as one of "10 Underrated PlayStation Gems".

The game won the award for both "Best Puzzle Game" and "Best Multiplayer Game" at the 1998 OPM Editors' Awards. Hyper later named Devil Dice a second runner-up for "1999 Hyper Reader Awards" for "Best Puzzle Game", which went to Bust-A-Move 99 For Playstation and Nintendo 64.

Sequels
XI Jumbo was only released in Japan exclusively on PlayStation.

XI Little was also only released in Japan exclusively on WonderSwan Color.

Bombastic (XI Go in Japan) was released in Japan, North America and Europe exclusively on PlayStation 2. It incorporates all play modes from previous releases.

Xi Coliseum was only released in Japan exclusively on PlayStation Portable. This version includes support for ad hoc wireless play between up to five players.

Notes

References

External links 

 

1998 video games
PlayStation (console) games
PlayStation Network games
Puzzle video games
Sony Interactive Entertainment games
Fiction about the Devil
Video games about demons
THQ games
Video games developed in Japan
Multiplayer and single-player video games